Ornipholidotos likouala is a butterfly in the family Lycaenidae. It is found in the Republic of the Congo. The habitat consists of forests.

References

Butterflies described in 1969
Ornipholidotos
Endemic fauna of the Republic of the Congo
Butterflies of Africa